Emu Bay (known as Maxwell from 1882 to 1941) is a locality in the  Australian state  of  South Australia on the north coast of Kangaroo Island located about  south-west of the state capital of Adelaide and about located about  west of the municipal seat of Kingscote. 

It is a small town of 97 allotments with an even mix of permanent and holiday homes. The town has no shops or mains water supply. Emu Bay is known as a popular swimming beach, and is one of few on Kangaroo Island where vehicles are permitted.

A small jetty dates to 1918. Until the 1930s, grain, stock and merchandise were taken to and from Kangaroo Island from this jetty.

Emu Bay is also the location of an unusual geological formation named Emu Bay shale.

The coastline from Cape D'Estaing at the west end of the bay known as Emu Bay to Point Marsden in the locality of North Cape in the east is listed on the South Australian Heritage Register as a site of “geological and outstanding palaeontological significance".

Emu Bay is located within the federal division of Mayo, the state electoral district of Mawson and the local government area of the Kangaroo Island Council.

References
Notes

Citations

Gallery

Coastal towns in South Australia
Towns on Kangaroo Island
Investigator Strait